Vernon Jay Foltz (August 27, 1918 – December 31, 1947) was an American football offensive lineman in the National Football League for the Washington Redskins and the Pittsburgh Steelers. Born in Clearfield, Pennsylvania, he attended St. Vincent College.

Foltz served in the United States Marines during World War II. He died of a self-inflicted gunshot wound to the temple on New Year's Eve 1947.

References

1918 births
1947 deaths
American football centers
American football offensive tackles
People from Clearfield, Pennsylvania
Pittsburgh Steelers players
Washington Redskins players
Players of American football from Pennsylvania
United States Marine Corps personnel of World War II
Suicides by firearm in Pennsylvania